The Special Atomic Demolition Munition (SADM), also known as the  XM129 and XM159 Atomic Demolition Charges, and the B54 bomb was a nuclear man-portable atomic demolition munition (ADM) system fielded by the US military from the 1960s to 1980s but never used in combat.

History and design

At the time of the weapon's development, the existing Atomic Demolition Munition (ADM) was the T-4 Atomic Demolition Munition. Its transport required 4 men, each carrying a  section of the weapon.

Development began in June 1960 and an interim Mark 54 Mod 0 (now called the B54-0) weapon was put into production in April 1963. Production of the B54 Mod 1 SADM began in August 1964. It included the warhead, a fuzing and firing system with a mechanical timer, a ferroelectric firing set and a sealed housing. The body was constructed with aluminum forgings and molded fiberglass, and foam-rubber insulation was used between the warhead and case. Dials were illuminated with a tritium-phosphor paint for easy night reading. A housing for underwater emplacement was provided that included external controls.

The B54 Mod 2 started production in June 1965.

The yield is estimated to be .

Use

Offensive use
ADM employment manuals describe the use of ADMs tactically in both offensive and defensive operations.

In offensive operations, ADMs are described as being useful for improving flank and rear security of a unit, impeding counterattacks and assisting in enemy entrapment.

Engineering and defensive use
ADM employment manuals describe the use of ADMs defensively for combat engineering purposes. Possible targets described include bridges, dams, canals, tunnels, airfields, railroad marshaling yards, ports and industrial plants, and power facilities.

Extensive tables were provided to enable the selection of the correct yield for each particular target. These tables accounted for various employment particulars such as depth of burial, fallout considerations, and minimum safe separation distances between adjacent weapons and personnel.

Suicide attack allegations

On December 27, 2018, the Green Bay Press-Gazette interviewed veteran Mark Bentley, who had trained for the Special Atomic Demolition Munition program to manually place and detonate the SADM. The report stated that he and other soldiers training for the program knew this was a suicide mission because either it would be unrealistic to outrun the timer on the bomb, or that soldiers would be obligated to secure the site before the timer went off.

However, employment manuals specifically describe the firing party and their guard retreating from the emplacement site, at which point security of the device is provided through a combination of passive security measures including concealment, camouflage, and the use of decoys; and by active security measures including booby traps, obstacles such as concertina wire and landmines, and long-range artillery fire. Further, the SADM included a Field Wire Remote Control System (FWRCS), a device that enabled the sending of safe/arm and firing signals to the weapon via a wire for safe remote detonation of the weapon.

See also
W54 Warhead
Medium Atomic Demolition Munition
Suitcase nuclear device
List of nuclear weapons

References

Bibliography

External links

 SADM Delivery by Parachutist/Swimmer (Special Atomic Demolition Munition) Film Clip (full film)
 image of the SADM
Foreign Policy Article on mission types and personnel
 ADM Web Page

Nuclear weapons of the United States
Land mines of the United States
Tactical nuclear weapons
1960s in the United States
Cold War weapons of the United States
Atomic demolition munitions
Military equipment introduced in the 1960s